Domingo Lorenzo Conde (14 September 1928 – 21 June 2009) was a Dominican sports shooter. He competed at the 1968 Summer Olympics and the 1972 Summer Olympics. He was inducted in the San Pedro de Macorís hall of fame in 2010. He was born in Galicia, Spain and arrived to the Dominican Republic when he was 22, receiving the Dominican citizenship.

References

1928 births
2009 deaths
Dominican Republic male sport shooters
Olympic shooters of the Dominican Republic
Shooters at the 1968 Summer Olympics
Shooters at the 1972 Summer Olympics
Sportspeople from Galicia (Spain)